Cheik Doukouré (born 1943), is a Guinean filmmaker. He is notable as the director of critically acclaimed film Le Ballon d'Or. Apart from filmmaking, he is also an actor, screenwriter and film producer.

Personal life
He was born in 1943 in Kankan, Guinea and had primary education in Conakry. In 1964, he left Guinea and moved to Paris, France. He completed the degree of modern literature at the Sorbonne University in 1964, in modern letters and at the same time at Cours Simon then at the Conservatory of rue Blanche in 1965.

Career
While in France, he started his career as an actor in the theater and on television. At the end of the 1970s, Doukouré began to write screenplays started with Bako, l'autre rive in 1978 and then popular play Black Mic Mac in 1986.

In 1986, he made his maiden cinema appearance with the film Les Ripoux. He also acted in the critically acclaim 1994 film Un indien dans la ville. In 1991, he made his directorial debut with Blanc d'ebene which takes place in Guinea during the Second World War. In 1993, he founded his production company in Guinea: 'Bako Productions'. Later in the same year, he produced his second feature Le Ballon d'Or. The film focuses on an African peasant who became a football star. In 2001, he created the film Les Films de l'Alliance along with his screenwriter Danielle Ryan.

In 2001, he produced and act in Paris selon Moussa. In 2003, he won the Prize for male interpretation at the 18th edition of Panafrican Film and Television Festival of Ouagadougou (FESPACO) for his role in Paris according to Moussa.

Filmography

References

External links
 

Living people
Guinean film directors
Guinean actors
French film directors
1943 births